Jerónimo de Alderete y Mercado (c. 1518 – April 7, 1556) was a Spanish conquistador who was later named governor of Chile, but died before he could assume his post.

Early life
Alderete was born in Olmedo, Castille in 1518, the son of Francisco de Mercado and of Isabel de Alderete. He came to Peru in 1535, under the orders of Diego de Rojas who intended to undertake the conquest of the Gran Chaco region. The expedition had several difficulties attempting to reach the Pilcomayo River. Alderete settled down in Tarija, until he became a member of Francisco de Aguirre's force who joined Pedro de Valdivia's in the conquest of Chile in 1540.

In Chile
Jerónimo de Alderete was part of Pedro de Valdivia's expedition to settle in the Mapocho valley of Chile in 1540. He was a regidor of the first city government of Santiago, Chile in 1541.  In 1544, he joined the expedition of Juan Bautista Pastene that was explore the lands to the south to the Straits of Magellan in the bark San Pedro.

In 1550, during the campaign to establish Concepción he led the cavalry charge that broke the leading division of the Mapuche army at the Battle of Penco. In 1552 Valdivia ordered Jerónimo de Alderete to go inland and establish a fort at Lake Villarrica and established a fort at the site of the present Villarrica.

In Europe
In late 1552, Pedro de Valdivia dispatched Alderete to negotiate the confirmation of his governorship with Charles V, but after he arrived back to Spain he discovered that the Emperor had transferred the suzerainty of Chile, and all his other territories, to his son Philip II, who was at the time living in England. Alderete then travelled to London, where he met the King and obtained from him the governorship-for-life for Valdivia. As he was on the road to Spain to start the journey back to Chile, he received the news of the death of Valdivia, so he returned to England once more, where the King appointed him to succeed Valdivia on October 17, 1554, and named him Adelantado and a Knight of Santiago.

In the meantime, back in Chile the will of Valdivia had also appointed him as his successor as governor of Chile, but that was disallowed by the Viceroy of Peru Melchor Bravo de Saravia, who appointed an interim governor.  As Alderete was returning to America to assume his post he was taken ill with yellow fever in Panamá and died there on April 7, 1556.

Additional information

See also

Pedro de Valdivia
Francisco de Villagra
Francisco de Aguirre
Alonso de Ercilla
Arauco War

Notes

Sources

1510s births
1556 deaths
Year of birth uncertain
People from the Province of Valladolid
Spanish conquistadors
Castilian-Leonese conquistadors
Knights of Santiago
Royal Governors of Chile
People of the Arauco War
16th-century Spanish people
Castilian conquistadors